The Apple Campus is the former corporate headquarters of Apple Inc. from 1993 until 2017, when it was largely replaced by Apple Park, though it is still used by Apple as office and lab space. The campus is located at 1 Infinite Loop in Cupertino, California, United States. Its design resembles that of a university, with the buildings arranged around green spaces, similar to a suburban business park.

History and founding

Apple's corporate headquarters was originally located at Building 1 on 20525 Mariani Ave in Cupertino. The land east of Mariani One across De Anza Boulevard where the campus was built was originally occupied by the company Four-Phase Systems (later acquired by Motorola). Construction began in 1992 and was completed in 1993 by the Sobrato Development Company. Before 1997, activities held on the campus were exclusively research and development. Until that time the buildings were referred to as R&D 1–6. With the return of Steve Jobs to Apple in 1997, changes were made to the campus: Apple increased the number of occupied buildings, and many activities not related to R&D were moved to the buildings on Infinite Loop, at which point they began to be referenced by their IL # designations. Steve Jobs left additional marks on the campus, for example, banning employees' pets and dramatically improving the cafeteria menu.

On the night of August 12, 2008, a fire broke out on the second floor of the building Valley Green 6. The firefighters worked for hours until the following morning to extinguish the fire. No injuries were reported, but the forty-year-old building suffered $2 million of fire damage.

Location and layout

The Apple Campus is located on the southeast corner of Interstate 280 and De Anza Boulevard, and occupies  in six buildings spread over four floors. Each building is numbered with one digit on the private U-shaped street Infinite Loop, so named because of the programming concept of an infinite loop. The street, in conjunction with Mariani Avenue, actually does form a circuit (or cycle) that can circulate indefinitely. The main building has the address 1 Infinite Loop, Cupertino, California. Employees refer to these buildings as IL1 to IL6 for Infinite Loop 1–6. Besides the buildings on Infinite Loop, the whole Apple Campus occupies an additional thirty buildings scattered throughout the city to accommodate its employees. Some of these buildings are leased (with an average rental cost of $2.50 per square foot), while others are of recent acquisition; the land that the new buildings occupy will be used for future construction of a second campus in the city with the aim of centralizing the activities of the company. At 1 Infinite Loop is an Apple Store selling Apple equipment and souvenirs. It is the only part of the campus open to the public.

References

External links

Cycling the Infinite Loop with interactive map on Kinomap
Pictures from Inside Apple HQ on AppleGazette.com
 

Apple Inc.
Corporate headquarters in Silicon Valley
High-tech architecture
Office buildings in California
Cupertino, California
Office buildings completed in 1993
1993 establishments in California
Buildings and structures in Santa Clara County, California